Sandhurst School is a coeducational secondary school and sixth form located in Sandhurst, Berkshire, England. The headteacher is Debbie Smith.

History
The school was opened in 1969. The first headteacher was Bill Dally. He retired from the post in 1982.

An extension was added to the school in 1971 to accommodate an additional 200 pupils and a youth wing.

In 1984, teachers at the school held a "work-in" in the context of strike action. This was intended to show people how much work teachers do in their own time.

In 1986, a siren was installed at the school, to be sounded if a patient escapes from Broadmoor Hospital.

In 2020, problems with the building meant pupils had to move to temporary classrooms.

Previously a community school administered by Bracknell Forest Council, in February 2022 Sandhurst School converted to academy status. It is now sponsored by the Corvus Learning Trust.

Ofsted inspections
As of 2021, the school's most recent Ofsted inspection was in 2017, with an overall judgement of Good.

References

External links
 School Website

Secondary schools in Bracknell Forest
Academies in Bracknell Forest
Sandhurst, Berkshire
1969 establishments in the United Kingdom
Educational institutions established in 1969